B & B Hospital (Baidya and Banskota Hospital) is a private hospital with the goal to provide health services to the community of Nepal founded in 1997.

The hospital was established in 1977 in order to provide an extensive and affordable service to the community. B&B was established by Dr. Jagdish Lal Baidya and Dr. Ashok K. Banskota. It is located over 2.26 acres and includes an educational wing called B&B Medical Institute. B&B Hospital's goal is to provide efficient healthcare in the country with many departments such as orthopedics, general surgery and urology, general medicine, plastic/cosmetic & maxillofacial surgery, gynecology and obstetrics, neuroscience, pediatrics, otorhinolaryngology, cardiology, oncology, cardiothoracic & vascular surgery, dental, psychiatry, dermatology & venereology, nephology, ophthalmology, pneumatology, anesthesiology, and nutrition.

B&B Hospital is known for their orthopedic, urological/surgical expertise. Employed at B&B Hospital are 120 professional doctors and 500+ staff members. Patients can choose from several health packages including: women's health package for age below 40, women's health package for age above 40, men's health package, gold health package for male, gold health package for female above 40, gold health package for female below 40, basic women's health package, and basic health package.

Services 
Services provided range from emergency and trauma care, outpatient department, in patient services, OT and surgical services, clinical laboratory, pharmacy, sociotherapy, optical diagnostics services, and radiology and imaging services.

 Department of Orthopaedic Surgery- services include joint replacement surgery, arthroscopy and sports medicine, spine surgery and spinal deformity correction, paediatric orthopaedics, arm and hand surgery.
 General Surgery and Urology- provides urology and laparoscopic services, as well as general surgery procedures. 
 General Medicine- services include upper gastrointestinal endoscopy, colonoscopy, ERCP, haemodialysis, peritoneal dialysis, pulmonary function testing.
 Plastic, Cosmetic and Maxilloficial Surgery- microvascular surgery, reconstructive, aesthetic and cosmetic operations are performed, as well as maxillofacial operations that manage simple to complex facial bone fractures.
 Gynaecology and Obstetrics- the department deals with all obstetric emergencies, including prenatal and antenatal care, normal and abnormal deliveries, as well as providing safe abortion services, family planning and counseling services. All gynaecological procedures are performed, including laparoscopic major gynaecological surgery, colposcopy, hysterectomy and uro-gynaecological operations.
 Neuroscience- the department is equipped to handle all kinds of head and spinal problems, such as various traumas, tumors, congenital anomalies, vascular problems, etc. The department is also involved in the hospital's academic activities.
 Paediatrics-the department provides care for newborns admitted with cases like AGE, pneumonia, meningitis, etc. 
 ENT- departmental services include microsurgery of the ear, surgery of the nose and the throat, head and neck surgery.
 Cardiology- services include emergency management and intensive care, cardiac catheterization, blood pressure and heart rhythm monitoring, angiography, angioplasty & stenting, device implantation, peripheral interventions, echocardiography and color doppler.
 Oncology- the hospital's cancer centre provides medical and surgical treatment to patients, including daily OPD consultations, chemotherapy, treatment planning and surgical procedures.
 Cardiothoracic and Vascular Surgery
 Dental
 Psychiatry
 Dermatology and Venereology- active in both academic and research activities, the department offers consultations for skin and sexually transmitted diseases and cosmetological problems, allergo-diagnostic tests, electro-catheterization, mole excision and skin biopsies.
 Nephrology- the services offered include OPD, pre- and post-transplant follow up, and haemodialysis.
 Ophthalmology
 Rheumatology
 Anesthesiology
 Nutrition & Dietetics
 Dermatology & Venerology

References
5. Hospital Site

Hospital buildings completed in 1997
Hospitals in Nepal
Hospitals established in 1997
1997 establishments in Nepal